Charles Judels (August 17, 1882 – February 14, 1969) was a Dutch-born American actor.

Early years
Judels was born on August 17, 1882, in Amsterdam as a third generation in a family of actors. His grandfather owned several theatres throughout the Netherlands and starred in his own plays. Judels' father combined his love of theatre and music and was a stage manager for the Metropolitan Opera in New York for 35 years.

Career
Judels appeared in more than 130 films from 1915 to 1949. In 1928, he was signed by 20th Century Fox to direct Movietone and did extensive work as a voice-over actor in animated films, including the voices of Stromboli and The Coachman in Walt Disney's Pinocchio (1940). In 1909, he became a member of The Lambs. 

Judels died in San Francisco, California in 1969, aged 86.

Selected filmography

 My Old Dutch (1915) – Jules Joubert
 The Commuters (1915) – Prof. Anatole 'Sammy' Vermouth
 Little Old New York (1923) – Delmonica
 Under the Red Robe (1923) – Antoine
 Frozen Justice (1929) – French Sailor
 Hot for Paris (1929) – Charlott Gouset
 Let's Go Places (1930) – Du Bonnet (uncredited)
 The Big Party (1930) – Dupuy (uncredited)
 Cheer Up and Smile (1930) – Pierre
 Oh, Sailor Behave (1930) – De Medici
 College Lovers (1930) – Spectator
 The Doorway to Hell (1930) – Florist (scenes deleted)
 The Life of the Party (1930) – Mons. LeMaire
 Captain Thunder (1930) – Commandante Ruiz
 The Easiest Way (1931) – Mr. Gensler (uncredited)
 50 Million Frenchmen (1931) – Pernasse – Hotel Manager
 God's Gift to Women (1931) – Undertaker
 Women of All Nations (1931) – Leon (uncredited)
 Gold Dust Gertie (1931) – Monsieur Pestalozzi
 Take 'em and Shake 'em (1931, Short)
 The Tamale Vendor (1931, Short)
 Moonlight and Cactus (1932, Short)
 High Pressure (1932) – Salvatore (uncredited)
 One Hour with You (1932) – Policeman (uncredited)
 Close Relations (1933, Short) – Uncle Ezra Wart
 Tomalio (1933, Short) – The General
 The Mighty Barnum (1934) – Maitre D'Hotel
 The Night Is Young (1935) – Riccardi (uncredited)
 Symphony of Living (1935) – Rozzini
 Enchanted April (1935) – Domenico
 The Florentine Dagger (1935) – Salvatore
 King Solomon of Broadway (1935) – Hot dog man
 Give Us This Night (1936) – Second Carabiniere
 The Great Ziegfeld (1936) – Pierre
 Suzy (1936) – Producer (uncredited)
 San Francisco (1936) – Tony
 I'd Give My Life (1936)
 Mr. Cinderella (1936) – Randolph's Chef (uncredited)
 Rose Bowl (1936) – Mr. Schultz (uncredited)
 Along Came Love (1936) – Joe Jacobs
 The Plainsman (1936) – Tony – The Barber
 The Big Show (1936) – Swartz, the studio head
 Love on the Run (1936) – Lieutenant of Police
 When's Your Birthday? (1937) – Headwaiter
 Swing High, Swing Low (1937) – Tony
 Maytime (1937) – Cabby
 Song of the City (1937) – Mr. Pietro 'Papa' Romandi
 Mountain Music (1937) – Potts Show Orchestra Leader (uncredited)
 Rhythm in the Clouds (1937) – Luigi Fernando
 Marry the Girl (1937) – Andre Victor Antoine Descate
 It Can't Last Forever (1937) – Mr. Appadelius
 The Life of the Party (1937) – Maitre d'Hotel
 Wife, Doctor and Nurse (1937) – Chef
 The Bride Wore Red (1937) – Cordellera Bar Proprietor (uncredited)
 Live, Love and Learn (1937) – Pedro Felipe
 Fight for Your Lady (1937) – Felix Janos
 Ebb Tide (1937) – Port Doctor
 High Flyers (1937) – Mr. Fontaine
 You're Only Young Once (1937) – Capt. Swenson of the Shorty II
 Love and Hisses (1937) – Oscar
 Mad About Music (1938) – Conductor (uncredited)
 Reckless Living (1938) – Harry Myron
 Stolen Heaven (1938) – Huberl
 Hold That Kiss (1938) – Otto Schmidt – Landlord (uncredited)
 Swiss Miss (1938) – Cheese Factory Proprietor
 Gold Diggers in Paris (1938) – Barman (uncredited)
 Passport Husband (1938) – Captain of Busboys (uncredited)
 Flirting with Fate (1938) – Don Luis Garcia
 Idiot's Delight (1939) – Daka (uncredited)
 The Ice Follies of 1939 (1939) – Makeup Man (uncredited)
 Lady of the Tropics (1939) – Gaston Lubois (uncredited)
 Ninotchka (1939) – Pere Mathieu – Cafe Owner (uncredited)
 That's Right-You're Wrong (1939) – Luigi (uncredited)
 Henry Goes Arizona (1939) – The Great Beldini (uncredited)
 Balalaika (1939) – Batoff (uncredited)
 Pinocchio (1940) – Stromboli & The Coachman (voice, uncredited)
 Strange Cargo (1940) – Renard (uncredited)
 Viva Cisco Kid (1940) – Don Pancho
 It All Came True (1940) – Henri Pepi de Bordeau
 On Their Own (1940) – Giuseppe Galentoni
 Florian (1940) – Editor
 Gold Rush Maisie (1940) – Hula Paradise Cafe owner
 Girl from Avenue A (1940) – Waiter (uncredited)
 Stranger on the Third Floor (1940) – Nick Nanbajan – Cafe Owner (uncredited)
 Hired Wife (1940) – Photographer (uncredited)
 Public Deb No. 1 (1940) – Ivan
 Down Argentine Way (1940) – Dr. Arturo Padilla
 The Villain Still Pursued Her (1940) – M. Dubois – Pie Vendor
 Bitter Sweet (1940) – Herr Wyler
 Cheers for Miss Bishop (1941) – Cecco
 I'll Wait for You (1941) – A. Bardosch, Nightclub Owner (uncredited)
 Blondie in Society (1941) – Julie's Owner (uncredited)
 Sweetheart of the Campus (1941) – Tomasso aka Victor Demond
 This Woman Is Mine (1941) – Cafe Proprietor
 Law of the Tropics (1941) – Captain of River Boat
 The Chocolate Soldier (1941) – Klementov
 Kathleen (1942) – Manager
 A Close Call for Ellery Queen (1942) – Corday
 Tortilla Flat (1942) – Joe Machado (uncredited)
 I Married an Angel (1942) – Customs Officer (uncredited)
 Baby Face Morgan (1942) – 'Deacon' Davis
 Police Bullets (1942) – Duke Talbot
 Der Fuehrer's Face (1943) – Off-stage Nazi (voice, uncredited)
 Education for Death (1943) – Adolf Hitler (voice, uncredited)
 American Empire (1943) – Storekeeper (uncredited)
 The Hard Way (1943) – Mr. Flores (uncredited)
 Kid Dynamite (1943) – Nick – Pool Hall Owner
 Something to Shout About (1943) – Brother Hunkafer (uncredited)
 Swing Your Partner (1943) – Digby
 Du Barry Was a Lady (1943) – Innkeeper (uncredited)
 I Dood It (1943) – Stage Manager
 Northern Pursuit (1943) – Nick – Barber (uncredited)
 Career Girl (1944) – Felix Black
 Knickerbocker Holiday (1944) – Renasaler (uncredited)
 Broadway Rhythm (1944) – Swami (uncredited)
 Kismet (1944) – Wealthy Merchant (uncredited)
 A Bell for Adano (1945) – Afronti (uncredited)
 Sunbonnet Sue (1945) – Milano
 Whistle Stop (1946) – Sam Veech
 Tangier (1946) – Dimitri
 The Hoodlum Saint (1946) – Captain of Waiters (scenes deleted)
 In Old Sacramento (1946) – Tony Marchetti
 Her Adventurous Night (1946) – Petrucci
 Plainsman and the Lady (1946) – Manuel Lopez
 The Mighty McGurk (1947) – First Brewer
 I Wonder Who's Kissing Her Now (1947) – Herman Bartholdy (uncredited)
 Panhandle (1948) – Botticelli the Barber
 Samson and Delilah (1949) – Danite Merchant (uncredited)
 Casey Bats Again (1954) – Narrator

References

External links

1882 births
1969 deaths
20th-century American male actors
American male film actors
American male silent film actors
American male voice actors
Dutch male film actors
Dutch male silent film actors
Dutch emigrants to the United States
Male actors from Amsterdam
Members of The Lambs Club